Rising is the eleventh studio album by the American hard rock band Great White, released in 2009. It was recorded in the winter of 2008 with completion in early 2009. Rising was mixed, produced, and engineered by Michael Lardie with all members of the group contributing to the final mix. This is the final album with original  singer Jack Russell before the split that led to the creation of his own-fronted version of the band.

Track listing 
"Situation" (Mark Kendall, Michael Lardie, Jack Russell) – 5:00
"All or Nothin'" (Kendall, Lardie, Russell) – 5:19
"I Don't Mind" (Lardie, Russell) – 5:19
"Shine" (Kendall, Russell) – 5:54
"Loveless" (Lardie, Russell) – 5:39
"Is It Enough" (Kendall, Lardie, Russell) – 4:14
"Last Chance" (Kendall, Lardie, Russell) – 4:11
"Danger Zone" (Kendall, Russell) – 4:37
"Down on the Level" (Audie Desbrow, Kendall, Lardie, Russell) – 4:03
"Only You Can Do" (Kendall, Lardie, Russell) – 5:02
"My Sanctuary" (Kendall, Russell) – 5:36

Bonus tracks 
The European and Japanese releases add a Rolling Stones cover as track 12.

"Let's Spend the Night Together" (Jagger/Richards) (European release only)
"Can't You Hear Me Knocking" (Jagger/Richards) (Japanese release only)

Personnel 
 Jack Russell – lead and backing vocals
 Mark Kendall – guitar, backing vocals
 Michael Lardie – guitar, keyboards, mandolin, sitar, harmonica, percussion, backing vocals, producer, engineer
 Scott Snyder – bass, backing vocals
 Audie Desbrow – drums

References 

2009 albums
Great White albums
Frontiers Records albums
Shrapnel Records albums